Regional School District #10 serves the towns of Burlington and Harwinton Connecticut.
It is located at 24 Lyon Road, Burlington, CT 06013.

Staff
Superintendent: Alan Beitman

Schools
Regional School District 10 has four Schools
Lake Garda Elementary School
Harwinton Consolidated Elementary School
Har-Bur Middle School
Lewis S. Mills High School

References

External links

Schools in Connecticut